Neptuniibacter marinus is a Gram-negative, aerobic and motile bacterium from the genus of Neptuniibacter which has been isolated from the scallop Pecten maximus.

References

External links
Type strain of Neptuniibacter marinus at BacDive -  the Bacterial Diversity Metadatabase

Oceanospirillales
Bacteria described in 2017